The Bucks Burn is a stream in Aberdeen which flows into the River Don.  It lends its name to the former town of Bucksburn which is now part of Aberdeen City.

Rivers of Aberdeen